Mungo may refer to:

People 
 Mungo (name), a list of people with the given name or surname
 Mungo people, an ethnic group in Cameroon

Places 
 Mungo, Angola, a town and municipality
 Mungo National Park, Australia
 Lake Mungo, Australia
 Mungo River, Cameroon
 Mungo River, New Zealand

Other uses 
 Mungo bean
 Mungo ESK, an armoured transport vehicle used by the German Army
 Mungo, an oil field in the North Sea
 Mungo, a fictional character from the animated television series  Heathcliff
 Mungo, a fibrous woollen material generated from waste fabric

See also
 Mungo Man and Mungo Woman, names of two sets of prehistoric human remains found in Australia - see Lake Mungo remains
 John Mungo-Park (1918–1941), British fighter pilot
 Mungo Jerry, a 1970s British rock group
 Mungos, a mongoose genus
 Mongo (disambiguation)
 St. Mungo's (disambiguation)
 Moengo, Suriname, a town
 Moungo (department), Cameroon